The Forged Bride is a 1920 American drama film directed by Douglas Gerrard and written by Hal Hoadley. The film stars Thomas Jefferson, Mary MacLaren, Harold Miller, Dorothy Hagan, J. Barney Sherry and Dagmar Godowsky. The film was released on March 8, 1920, by Universal Film Manufacturing Company.

Cast       
Thomas Jefferson as Bill Butters
Mary MacLaren as Peggy
Harold Miller as Dick Van Courtland 
Dorothy Hagan as Dick's Mother
J. Barney Sherry as Clark Farrell
Dagmar Godowsky as Clara Ramerez

References

External links
 

1920 films
1920s English-language films
Silent American drama films
1920 drama films
Universal Pictures films
American silent feature films
American black-and-white films
1920s American films